Rodolfo Edén Muñoz Cantú, better known as Edén Muñoz
(born September 25, 1990), is a Mexican singer, songwriter and producer of Regional Mexican music.

Biography
Muñoz is the youngest of four siblings born to Rodolfo Muñoz and Isidora Cantú. As a young child, Muñoz and his family moved from Los Mochis, Sinaloa to Mazatlán.

Edén's older brother Daniel gave him guitar lessons when Edén was eight and he quickly learned how to play it.

After several years of playing music in family gatherings, local bands, festivals, and restaurants, in 2006 Muñoz was given the opportunity to formally join a professional band. He became a vocalist and guitarist for the band Colmillo Norteño, which after ten years of being founded and playing traditional Norteño music, they changed their style to what is now known as Norteño-Banda, a combination between Norteño and Banda music. While in the band, Muñoz learned to play the diatonic button accordion and became the band's lead vocalist. He also wrote some songs for the band.

In early 2010, due to differences with the other members of the band, Muñoz left Colmillo Norteño and formed his own group with the same Norteño-Banda concept and was called Puro Colmillo Norteño. This did not last for him to get into trouble with his previous band. To avoid legal conflicts, the new band's name was changed to Calibre 50.

Between 2010 and 2022, Muñoz was the leader, main songwriter, main producer, vocalist, and accordionist for Calibre 50. With the band, Muñoz managed to obtain the record for the most songs that would reach No. 1 for a Regional Mexican band or solo artist on Billboard.

Muñoz has also been a songwriter of several hits for other Regional Mexican acts.

In early 2022, Muñoz left Calibre 50 to pursue a solo career.

Discography

With Colmillo Norteño
 2008: El Cid
 2009: 2009
 2009: Sueño Guajiro

With Calibre 50

 2010: Renovar o Morir (Originally issued under the name "Puro Colmillo Norteño"; later reissued as Calibre 50.)
 2011: De Sinaloa Para El Mundo
 2012: El Buen Ejemplo
 2013: La Recompensa
 2013: Corridos de Alto Calibre
 2014: Contigo
 2014: Siempre Contigo (Spotify Sessions)
 2015: Historias de La Calle
 2016: Desde El Rancho
 2017: En Vivo desde el Auditorio Telmex
 2017: Guerra de Poder
 2018: Mitad y Mitad
 2019: Simplemente Gracias
 2020: En Vivo
 2020: Desde el Estudio Andaluz Music
 2021: Vamos Bien
 2021: En Vivo desde Rancho San Vicente

As a Solo Artist
 2021: Creo en Ti (non-album single)
 2022: Chale (non-album single)
 2022: Chalino (non-album single)
 2022: Hay Que Hacer Dinero with Banda MS (non-album single)
 2022: Te Voy a Encontrar (non-album single)
 2022: No Sabía Cuánto with Michelle Maciel (non-album single)
 2022: Viejo (non-album single)
 2022: La Balanza de la Vida (non-album single)
 2022: Simplemente Amigos (non-album single)
 2022: Inolvidable (non-album single)
 2022: La Historia Debe Continuar: Tour En Vivo (live album)
 2022: Consejos Gratis (studio album)
 2022: Fuiste Tú (single)
 2023: Te Invito a Ser Feliz (single)
 2023: ¿Cómo Se Supera? with MC Davo (single)

Awards and nominations

Artists and Collaborations
Muñoz has collaborated with or written songs for the following artists:

 Colmillo Norteño
 Calibre 50
 Gerardo Ortíz
 Conjunto Atardecer
 La Estructura
 El Komander
 Julión Álvarez
 Banda MS
 Banda Carnaval
 La Arrolladora Banda El Limón
 Banda La Adictiva
 Banda El Recodo
 Banda Los Recoditos
 Los Gfez
 Los Canarios de Michoacán  
 Diego Herrera
 Banda Los Sebastianes
 Los Rieleros del Norte
 Los de La Noria
 Grupo Cuarto de Milla
 Joel Elizalde
 Grupo Firme
 El Fantasma
 Joan Sebastian (posthumous collaboration)
 Darey Castro 
 Intocable
 Alejandro Fernández 
 La Fiera de Ojinaga
 Geru y su Legión 7 
 Jorge Medina
 Pancho Barraza 
 C-Kan
 Alfredo Olivas
 Josi Cuen 
 José Manuel Figueroa
 MC Davo
 Río Roma 
 Los Dos Carnales
 Carlos Rivera
 Pepe Aguilar 
 Alex Fernández
 Beto Sierra
 Santa Fe Klan
 Yuridia
 Michelle Maciel
 Christian Nodal 
 Bronco
 Panchito Arredondo
 Matisse
 El Trono de México
 Fuerza Regida
 Leonardo Aguilar
 Marca Registrada

References

1990 births
Living people
Mexican male singer-songwriters